Visitors to Senegal require a visa unless they come from one of the visa exempt countries. Visitors must hold passports that are valid for at least 6 months from the date of arrival.

Visa policy map

Visa exemption 

Citizens of the following 61 countries can visit Senegal without a visa for up to 90 days:

Holders of passport for Public Affairs of China can visit Senegal without a visa for 30 days.  Holders of a Laissez-Passer issued by the United Nations traveling on duty and holders of a Laissez-Passer issued by the Economic Community of West African States do not require a visa.

Holders of diplomatic passports issued to nationals of Turkey and holders of diplomatic and official/service passports issued to nationals of Algeria, China, Gabon, Libya, Russia,

Tanzania and Uganda do not require a visa.

In October 2019 Senegalese Minister of the Interior announced that Senegal would reintroduce visa requirements for all visitors except ECOWAS citizens by the end of 2019.

Visa on arrival 

According to Timatic (not listed on the Senegalese Ministry of Foreign Affairs website), Senegal is known to operate a visa-on-arrival system.

Nationals of the following countries are eligible for a visa upon arrival for a stay of up to 1 month and must hold a passport valid for at least 6 months from the date of arrival, round-trip air tickets and proof of accommodation.

Senegal no longer requires visas for U.S. citizens for stays of fewer than 90 days.

See also

Visa requirements for Senegalese citizens

References

S